Kotta Abdul Khader Musliyar (Arabic: كود عبد القادر مسليار, Malayalam: കോട്ട അബ്ദല്‍ ഖാദിര്‍ മുസ്‌ലിയാര്‍) was the prominent Islamic scholar hailing from Mogral, Kasaragod, district of Indian state Kerala and an active member of Samastha Kerala Jamiyyathul Ulama.

Early life
He was born as the son of Sea-Man Kotta Mohammed (Mammunji) and Khadeeja in 17 November 1939 at Kasaragod district. He completed his higher studies from Kumbla high school and later admitted in various darses at Oliyathoor, Padanna, Ichilangod. For further studies, he went to Dayooband and Delhi in early 1965s. He tied knot with Rooqiya, the daughter of Abdul Rahman Musliyar, then quazi of Kumbadaja, a village in Kasaragod.

In the field of service
After completing course from Deband, he served in Malabar Islamic Complex, Chattangal, Kasaragod, Shafi Masjid (Karnataka), Khilar Juma Masjid (Thayalangadi, Kasaragod) Thuruthi Juma Masjid, Parangipat Juma Masjid, Nellikunnu Muhyaddin Juma Masjid, Ichilangode Juma Masjid and Ummathur college. His valuable service was extended to the social and religious sector as he risked life and limb for the upheaval of the Muslim society. He occupied the office of joint secretary of Samastha Kerala Jamiyyathul Ulama, Quazi of Mangalore (1990–2008), district secretary of Samasth Kannur wing, member of Samasth Vidyabya board, vice president of MIC. He served as the principal of MIC Mutavval College, Umattur Arabic college. He was notable personality in the astronomy and Islamic jurisprudence and was famous for his command in Arabic, English, Urdu, Malayalam, Persian languages.

Death
He died on 3 September 2008 and was buried in Mogral Kadappuram Juma Masjid.

References

1939 births
2008 deaths
People from Kasaragod district
Indian Sunni Muslim scholars of Islam
Kerala Sunni-Shafi'i scholars